Shakh Kupal (also Romanized as Shākh Kūpāl; also known as Shākheh and Shakhehé Koopal) is a village in Gheyzaniyeh Rural District, in the Central District of Ahvaz County, Khuzestan Province, Iran. At the 2006 census, its population was 327, in 62 families.

References 

Populated places in Ahvaz County